Claremorris railway station serves the town of Claremorris in County Mayo, Ireland. It opened on 19 May 1862.

The station is on the Dublin to Westport Rail service. Passengers to or from Galway travel to Athlone and change trains. Passengers to or from Ballina and Foxford travel to Manulla Junction and change trains. Claremorris is planned to be a junction on the Western Rail Corridor if phase two (Athenry to Tuam) and phase three (Tuam to Claremorris) are completed.

References

External links
 Irish Rail Claremorris Station Website
 West On Track

Iarnród Éireann stations in County Mayo
Railway stations in County Mayo
Railway stations opened in 1862
1862 establishments in Ireland
Railway stations in the Republic of Ireland opened in the 19th century